Zarghamabad (also Romanized as Ẕarghāmābād) is a village in Hana Rural District, in the Central District of Semirom County, Isfahan Province, Iran. At the 2006 census, its population was 188, in 40 families.

References 

Populated places in Semirom County